Ricetown is an unincorporated community located in Owsley County, Kentucky, United States.

The community derives its name from Harvey Rice, a local merchant.

References

Unincorporated communities in Owsley County, Kentucky
Unincorporated communities in Kentucky